Capoeta saadii is a cyprinid fish endemic to Iran.

References 

saadii
Fish described in 1847